John L. Morris (born 1948) is an American billionaire businessman, and the founder, majority owner, and CEO of Bass Pro Shops, a hunting and fishing retail chain in the US and Canada. As of February 2023, his  net worth was estimated at US$8.3 billion.

Early life
John Morris was born in Springfield, Missouri in 1948. Morris was educated at Drury University.

Career
Morris founded Bass Pro Shops in 1972 when he began selling fishing equipment in the back of one of his father's Brown Derby liquor stores in Springfield. According to Forbes, Morris has a net worth of $8.3 billion.
Morris is also the founder of the White River Marine Group.

Morris opened the Wonders of Wildlife Museum & Aquarium in Springfield, in 2017. The museum helps bring visitors to Bass Pro's store there, with which it shares a location. In September 2017, Bass Pro acquired Cabela’s, another retailer of outdoor merchandise, for $4 billion.

Morris and his family were presented with the Audubon Medal in February 2019, in recognition of their conservation efforts.

Morris also founded the Top of the Rock golf course in Branson, Missouri, which houses one of the largest collection of Native American arrowheads and art in the region. Top of the Rock experienced a 70-foot wide sinkhole on May 22, 2016.

Personal life
He is married, with four children, and lives in Springfield, Missouri.

References 

1948 births
Living people
American businesspeople
American billionaires
Drury University alumni
People from Springfield, Missouri